Count Heinrich von Bünau (2 June 1697 – 7 April 1762) was a statesman and historian from the Electorate of Saxony, now part of Germany.

Life
Born in Weissenfels, Bünau was the son of Heinrich von Bünau (1665–1745), a Chancellor of the Elector of Saxony who was created a Count of the Holy Roman Empire on 24 March 1742 and Juliana Dorothea Dorothea von Geismar.

After studying at the University of Leipzig, Bünau entered the service of the Electors of Saxony and became an assessor in the Upper Court (Oberhofgericht) at Leipzig. Later he became Senior Consistory President and Privy Councillor (Wirklicher Geheimrat).

He received advancement through the good offices of the Cabinet Minister of the Electors of Saxony, Count von Hoym, the uncle of his second wife. In 1734, after Hoym had been ousted by Count Brühl, Heinrich von Bünau was downgraded to the position of Senior Overseer of the County of Mansfeld in Eisleben.

In 1741 however he entered the service of the Emperor Charles VII, who made him an Imperial Privy Councillor (Reichshofrat), the first Protestant to fill that role, and employed him as an ambassador in the area of Upper and Lower Saxony. In 1745, after the death of the emperor, Bünau withdrew to his estate at Nöthnitz near Dresden to pursue his scientific and historical studies.

Between 1744 and 1751 he had Dahlen Castle built, on the Dahlen estate he had acquired by marriage, and for the decoration of which he commissioned Adam Friedrich Oeser in 1756. Apart from the estates of Nöthnitz, Dahlen, and Ossmannstedt, Bünau also owned those of Domsen, Göllnitz and Gross-Tauschwitz.

In 1751 Bünau was appointed as Guardian Governor of the Duchy of Saxe-Eisenach, during the minority of Duke Constantin, for whom in 1756 he became Prime Minister in Weimar. In 1759, after the death of the Duke, he retired and spent the evening of his life on his estate at Ossmannstedt, near Weimar, where he died on 7 April 1762. after his death Ossmannstedt was used as a summer house by the Duchess Anna Amalia of Saxe-Weimar-Eisenach and her sons between 1762 and 1775.

Library
Bünau's private library comprised some 42,000 volumes. It was housed at first in Dresden, then on his estate at Nöthnitz, and he allowed public access to it. The archaeologist Johann Joachim Winckelmann from Stendal worked at Nöthnitz between 1748 and 1754 as Bünau's secretary.

Works 
 "Probe einer genauer und umständlichen Teutschen Kayser- und Reichshistorie oder Leben und Thaten Friedrichs I. Römischen Kaysers" (1722) (Attempt at a Comprehensive History of the German Emperor and Empire, or, The Life and Deeds of Frederick I, Holy Roman Emperor)
 "Genaue und umständliche teutsche Kayser- und Reichshistorie aus den bewährtesten Geschichtsschreibern und Urkunden zusammengetragen" in 4 volumes (1728–1743) (Exact and Comprehensive History of the German Emperor and Empire compiled from the Most Valued Historians and Documents)
 "Historie des Kriegs zwischen Frankreich, England und Teutschland" in 4 volumes (1763–1767) (History of the War between France, England  and Germany)

Notes

References
 Czok, Karl, 1988: August der Starke und Kursachsen (2nd ed., 1988, pp. 124f, with portrait). Leipzig
 Justi, Carl, 1922: Winckelmann und seine Zeitgenossen, vol 1 (3rd ed., 1922)
 Sahrer v. Sahr, 1869: Heinrich, Graf von Bünau

External links
 Website of the von Bünau family 
  Schloss Nöthnitz 
 Bünaugut (later Wielandgut) in Ossmannstedt 

1697 births
1762 deaths
People from Weißenfels
People from Saxe-Weissenfels
18th-century German historians
German male non-fiction writers
Counts of Germany
Members of the Göttingen Academy of Sciences and Humanities